Sainath Thotapalli (born 27 April 1956) is a well-known writer from the Telugu film industry (also known as Tollywood) and has written for 98 Telugu movies so far including Sitara, Swathimutyam, Swarnakamalam, Swayamkrushi, Sirivennela, Prema, Challenge, Marana Mrudangam, Pavitra Prema and Rakhi among others. He was also long associated with the Mumbai film industry (also known as Bollywood) for movies such as Criminal and Gundagardi.

He worked on Padiappa, Veetilo Viseshamga, Madrasi and Villain for the Chennai film industry (also known as Kollywood). Sainath's contribution to Kannada language films (Years 1995-2000) include the only two films that the ex-chief minister Ramakrishna Hegde acted in – Prajashakthi and Marana Mrudanga. His association with the Kannada film industry has been for 14 Kannada films so far including Halunda Tavaru, Lion Jagapathi Rao among others.

Biography

Sainath is the fourth born to TSS Sharma and Susheela in Ananthapur from their seven children. Thanks to his father's job as a railway station master, he travelled extensively during his formative years and did his schooling from Chennai (then Madras), Rajahmundry, Anaparthi, Gudivada, Ongole and Nellore before going to Vijayawada. He did his graduation in BSc from SRR and CVR Government College at Vijayawada.

His writing skills started showing right from his school days when he wrote his first drama in class 7th and continued this work in the form of writing short stories during college. His first serious association with the creative industry started with his joining Kalabharathi, founded by Jandhyala Subramanya Sastry (who he considers his guru) in 1972. Here, he started acting in various plays and wrote his first playlet "Konark Vastunondi" in 1973. His play "Chaitanyam" was aired on All India Radio in 1974 and Vennela Keretam in 1976.

In 1979, he was taken by Jandhyala Subramanya Sastry as his writing assistant. In a span of nine months thereon, he worked on fourteen films as a writing assistant, both for Jandhyala and Satyanand. In 1982, he started his real work in the film industry as a script associate for Amayaka Chakrayavarthi for Janardhan Vallabhaneni (Producer: Vijay Bapineedu).

In 1984, Vamsi's Sitara was a major hit for which he debuted as dialogue writer,[1] and he continued his work for some of the most successful movies of the time until 2009. Some of the films include Swathi Muthyam, Swayamkrushi, Sirivennela, Challenge, Punya Stree, Swarnakamalam, Prema, Criminal and Krishna Vamsi's Rakhi among 92 films in Telugu. His strong association with the television medium gave several outputs in the form of soaps Anubandham, Kalisiundaam Raa for Balaji Telefilms and Gayatri for Radon Media Ltd. He wrote for Janani produced by Jayasudha and Manase Mandiram for Kutty Padmini.

He is writer and director for Saakshi TV through Goli Soda, a political satire during 2008 General Elections. He was writer director for "Mixture Bandi" on TV5 during 2009, a weekly satire on political and film related developments during each week. Sainath is currently associated with his longtime associate K Vishwanath and working with Larsco Entertainment.
Sainath lives with his wife Aruna in Hyderabad with his son Sai Charan and daughter Sameera T.

Filmography

Telugu
	Sitaara (1984)
	Swati Mutyam (1984)
	Challenge (1984)
	Punyasthree (1985)
	Sirivennela (1985)
	Swayamkrushi (1986)
	Marana Mrudangam (1987)
	Swarnakamalam (1988)
	Prema Yuddham (1988)
       Prema (1989)
	Shanthi Kranthi (1991)
	Rao Gari Intlo Rowdy (1990)
	Rakhi (2006)
	Pavitra Prema
	Criminal (1995)
	Pelli Gola
	Pichhodi Cheti lo Rai
	Sanchalanam
	Amma-Naanna Kaavaali
	Khaidi Dada
	Saakshi
	Ukku Sankellu
	Lady James Bond
	Punnami Raatri
	Maa Vaari Gola
	Babai Hotel
	Kongu Chaatu Krishnudu
	Paaripoyina Khaideelu
	Anna Tammudu
	Donga Garu Swagatham
	Krishna Gari Abbai
	Vastaad
	Yama Dootalu
       Swethanaagu (2004)
	Slokam (2005)
	Sivaram
	Villain (2003)
	Todu Needa
	Viyyala Vari Kayyalu
	Subhapradam (2010)
	2011 Edukondalavadu
	2012 Tuniga Tuniga
	2014-15 Krishnamma Kalipindi Iddarini
	2015 Bahubali

Hindi
	1995 Criminal (Mukesh Bhatt, Mahesh Bhatt, Nagarjuna, Manisha Koirala, Ramya Krishna)
	1997 Gundagardi (KC Bokadia, Dharmendra, Vijay Shanthi, Simran, Aditya Panc

Tamil
	1999 Padayappa(KS Ravi Kumar, Rajnikanth, Ramya Krishna, Soundarya)

Kannada
	1990 Lion Jagapathi Rao (Vijay Kumar, Sai Prakash, Vishnu Vardhan, Lakshmi, Bhavya)
	1992 Prajashakthi (Chidambar Shetty, D Rajendra Babu, Ramakrishna Hegde, Malasree)
	1993 Marana Mrudanga (Chidambar Shetty, Rama Murthy, Ramakrishna Hegde, Malasree)
	1994 Halunda Thavaru (Vizag Raju, D Rajendra Babu, Vishnu Vardhan, Sitara)
	2015 Untitled. R Chandru directing, script underway
	2015 "Lady Singham", Vijay Kumar as Producer, Sai Prakash as Director, production planning
	Other Kannada Movies include: Jagadeka Veera, Roll Call Ramakrishna, Vyuha, Pradhama Sparsa, Soma, Jeevanadhi, Raja, Swaranjali among others.

References

Living people
Telugu people
Screenwriters from Andhra Pradesh
1956 births
People from Anantapur district
Indian male screenwriters
Telugu screenwriters
Kannada screenwriters
20th-century Indian dramatists and playwrights
20th-century Indian male writers